Luc Lacourcière, CC (October 18, 1910 – May 15, 1989) was a Quebec writer and ethnographer, who established himself during his lifetime as a leading figure in folklore studies. Trained by Marius Barbeau, he in turn influenced renowned researchers such as linguist Claude Poirier. In 1944, Lacourcière founded the Archives de folklore (AF), which he directed until 1975. Since 1978, a Luc-Lacourcière medal has been awarded every two years.

Honours received
 1967 - Member of the Society of Ten
 1969 - Ludger-Duvernay Prize
 1970 - Companion of the Order of Canada
 1971 - Killam Fellowship
 1974 - Canadian Music Council Medal
 1979 - Marius-Barbeau Medal
 1985 - Medal of the Académie des lettres du Québec
 1986 - Member of the Order of Francophones of America
 1986 - Price of 3-July-1608

External links
 Luc Lacourcière at The Canadian Encyclopedia

1910 births
1989 deaths
Companions of the Order of Canada
Canadian ethnographers
Writers from Quebec
Canadian non-fiction writers in French
Université Laval alumni
Academic staff of Université Laval